
Enz may refer to:

Rivers in Germany
 Enz, tributary of the River Neckar near Besigheim, county of Ludwigsburg, Baden-Württemberg, with two headstreams above Calmbach, Bad Wildbad, county of Calw:
 Große Enz, linker Oberlauf, often counted as the Enz itself
 Kleine Enz, right headstream
 Enz (Prüm), right tributary of the River Prüm in the Eifel in Holsthum, county of Bitburg-Prüm, Rhineland-Palatinate

People with the surname 
 Charles Enz (* 1925), Swiss physicist
 Jörg Enz (* 1974), German jazz guitarist
 Kurt Enz (1931–2004), German engineer, film engineer and specialist author
 Wilhelm Enz (1878–1966), German politician (SPD)

Miscellaneous 
 Waldbad Enz, open-air swimming pool in Dornbirn, Vorarlberg, Austria
 Split Enz, New Zealand band

See also 

 Enns (disambiguation)
 Ens (disambiguation)
 Entz
 Enzbach